My Little Pony: The Movie (Original Motion Picture Soundtrack) is the soundtrack album to the 2017 film My Little Pony: The Movie. The soundtrack album was released on September 22, 2017 by RCA Records.

Composition 

Most of the film's songs and its score were composed by My Little Pony: Friendship Is Magic songwriter Daniel Ingram, who first announced at GalaCon 2015 that he would be collaborating with a live studio orchestra for the film. On his songwriting for the film, Ingram said, "I had to challenge myself to push beyond what had been done in the TV show; to write bigger, more epic."

At Hasbro's Toy Fair investor presentation on February 17, 2017, the company announced that there would be seven original songs on the soundtrack. All orchestral parts of the score required approximately 5,800 pages of sheet music. Recording for the score began on June 5, 2017, and finished on June 11.

Sia contributed an original song to the film's soundtrack. Danish band Lukas Graham also contributed an original song for the film titled "Off to See the World", which was used in the film's first trailer. Other artists included in the album are American band DNCE and K-pop singer CL.<ref>{{cite web|url=https://www.billboard.com/articles/columns/k-town/7965887/cl-no-better-feeling-my-little-pony-movie-soundtrack|title=K-Pop Star CL Bringing 'No Better Feelin to 'My Little Pony' Movie Soundtrack|first=Tamar|last=Herman|publisher=Billboard|date=September 15, 2017|access-date=September 15, 2017}}</ref>

 Promotion 
Sia's "Rainbow" was released as a single on September 15, 2017. In a Facebook Live session on September 12, 2017, Twilight Sparkle (voiced by Tara Strong) and Pinkie Pie (voiced by Andrea Libman) announced that the song's music video would be released on Entertainment Weekly Facebook page on September 14, featuring Sia's regular alter ego played by Maddie Ziegler. Entertainment Weekly'' released the video later on September 19. "Off to See the World" by Lukas Graham was also released on October 5 as a single.

Track listing 

Songs from the film not included on the soundtrack are Rachel Platten's modified cover of "We Got the Beat" by The Go-Go's and the instrumental version of "The Girl from Ipanema" by Stan Getz and João Gilberto. All tracks after track 7 are left out of the film.

Charts

References 

2017 soundtrack albums
Animated film soundtracks
My Little Pony films
My Little Pony: Friendship Is Magic
RCA Records soundtracks